Anirban Bhattacharyya is an Indian television producer, author, standup comedian, and actor.

Author 
Bhattacharyya released his debut book entitled The Deadly Dozen: India's Most Notorious Serial Killers which is published by Penguin India. The book was launched by film-director Anurag Kashyap. The book has been endorsed by actors John Abraham, Ayushmann Khurrana, Ronit Roy and film directors Kiran Rao, Shashanka Ghosh, and writer Jayant Kripalani.

Bhattacharyya's true crime book, India's Money Heist: The Chelembra Bank Robbery, was published by Penguin India. The book is about the Chelembra Bank Robbery.

Actor and voice actor 
Bhattacharyya made his Bollywood debut in Sui Dhaaga: Made in India (2018), starring Varun Dhawan and Anushka Sharma, and directed by Sharat Katariya. He also appeared in Mission Mangal (2019).

Bhattacharyya appeared in Opium (2022), along with Vinay Pathak, Sharib Hashmi and Manu Rishi, which premiered at the 2022 Tokyo International  Film Festival.

References

External links
 Bhattacharyya's Amazon Author Page
 Bhattacharyya at Penguin India
 Bhattacharyya's Standup Comedy on Youtube
 Anirban Bhattacharyya on IMDB
 Anirban Bhattacharyya on Storizen

Living people
Year of birth missing (living people)
Indian television producers
People from Kolkata